The knockout stage of the 2007–08 UEFA Champions League began on 19 February 2008, and concluded on 21 May 2008 with the final at the Luzhniki Stadium, Moscow. The knockout stage involved the 16 teams who finished in the top two in each of their groups in the group stage.

Times are CET/CEST, as listed by UEFA (local times are in parentheses).

Format
Each tie in the knockout stage, apart from the final, was played over two legs, with each team playing one leg at home. The team that had the higher aggregate score over the two legs progressed to the next round. In the event that aggregate scores finished level, the team that scored more goals away from home over the two legs progressed. If away goals were also equal, 30 minutes of extra time were played. If there were goals scored during extra time and the aggregate score was still level, the visiting team qualified by virtue of more away goals scored. If no goals were scored during extra time, the tie was decided via a penalty shoot-out.

In the final, the tie was played over just one leg at a neutral venue. If scores were level at the end of normal time in the final, extra time was played, followed by penalties if scores remained tied.

Qualified teams

Bracket

Round of 16
The draw for the first knockout round of the 2007–08 UEFA Champions League was held on 21 December 2007 at 12:00 CET in Nyon, Switzerland. The first legs of the first knockout round were played on 19 February and 20 February 2008, while the second legs were played on 4 March, 5 March and, in the case of Internazionale and Liverpool, 11 March, due to a stadium clash with the match between Milan and Arsenal.

|}

First leg

Second leg

Arsenal won 2–0 on aggregate.

Barcelona won 4–2 on aggregate.

5–5 on aggregate; Fenerbahçe won on penalties.

Manchester United won 2–1 on aggregate.

1–1 on aggregate; Schalke 04 won on penalties.

Roma won 4–2 on aggregate.

Chelsea won 3–0 on aggregate.

Liverpool won 3–0 on aggregate.

Quarter-finals
The draw for the quarter-finals, semi-finals and final was held on Friday, 14 March 2008 at 13:00 CET in Nyon, Switzerland. The draw was conducted by UEFA General Secretary David Taylor and Rinat Dasayev, the ambassador for the final in Moscow. Unlike the first knockout round, teams from the same group or country could be drawn together from the quarter-finals onwards.

The first legs of the quarter-finals were played on 1 April and 2 April, while the second legs were played on 8 April and 9 April 2008.

|}

First leg

Second leg

Liverpool won 5–3 on aggregate.

Chelsea won 3–2 on aggregate.

Manchester United won 3–0 on aggregate.

Barcelona won 2–0 on aggregate.

Semi-finals
The first legs of the semi-finals were played on 22 April and 23 April, while the second legs were played on 29 April and 30 April 2008.

|}

First leg

Second leg

Manchester United won 1–0 on aggregate.

Chelsea won 4–3 on aggregate.

Final

The 2008 UEFA Champions League Final was played on 21 May 2008 at the Luzhniki Stadium in Moscow, Russia.

Notes

References

Knockout Stage
2007-08